The National Infrastructure Protection Plan (NIPP)  is a document called for by Homeland Security Presidential Directive 7, which aims to unify Critical Infrastructure and Key Resource (CIKR) protection efforts across the country. The latest version of the plan was produced in 2013   The NIPP's goals are to protect critical infrastructure and key resources and ensure resiliency.  It is generally considered unwieldy and not an actual plan to be carried out in an emergency, but it is useful as a mechanism for developing coordination between government and the private sector.  The NIPP is based on the model laid out in the 1998 Presidential Decision Directive-63, which identified critical sectors of the economy and tasked relevant government agencies to work with them on sharing information and on strengthening responses to attack.

The NIPP is structured to create partnerships between Government Coordinating Councils (GCC) from the public sector and Sector Coordinating Councils (SCC) from the private sector for the eighteen sectors DHS has identified as critical.

Sector Specific Agencies

 United States Department of Agriculture
 United States Department of Defense
 United States Department of Energy
 United States Department of Health and Human Services
 United States Department of the Interior
 United States Department of the Treasury
 United States Environmental Protection Agency
 United States Department of Homeland Security
Cybersecurity and Infrastructure Security Agency
Transportation Security Administration
United States Coast Guard
 United States Immigration and Customs Enforcement
 Federal Protective Service

Sector Coordinating Councils

 Agriculture and Food
 Defense Industrial Base
 Energy
 Public Health and Healthcare
 Financial Services
 Water and Wastewater Systems
 Chemical
 Commercial Facilities
 Dams
 Emergency Services
 Nuclear Reactors, Materials, and Waste
 Information Technology
 Communications
 Postal and Shipping
 Transportation Systems
 Government Facilities

References

2. DHS NIP 2013 Supplement - Executing CI Risk Management Approach

Infrastructure in the United States
United States Department of Homeland Security
Security engineering